Begonia eiromischa, commonly known as woolly-stalked begonia, is a presumed extinct plant from Malaysia.

It occurred at granite rocks in an altitude of 170 m in the proximity of dipterocarp forests. Begonia eiromischa is only known from two collections made in 1886 and 1898 at Pulau Betong, Penang Island in Malaysia. Its habitat was completely destroyed as a result of agricultural alteration, especially farming and logging. Despite extensive surveys it could not be rediscovered and so it was officially declared extinct by the IUCN in 2007.

References

Kiew, R. 1989. Lost and found: Begonia eiromischa and B. rajah. Nature Malaysiana 14: 64-67 and front cover.
Kiew, R. 2005. Begonias of Peninsular Malaysia. Kota Kinabalu: Natural History Publications (Borneo). pp. 22, 35.

eiromischa
Endemic flora of Peninsular Malaysia
Extinct plants
Extinct biota of Asia
Plant extinctions since 1500